Benthin is a surname. Notable people with the surname include:

Gustave Benthin (born 1991), American football player
Johan Benthin (1936–2006), Danish artist
Manuel Benthin (born 1979), German footballer

See also
The Benthin Family, East German 1950 film